Erich Hess may refer to:
 Erich Hess (gymnast)
 Erich Hess (politician)